Cheyenne Enterprises is an American television and film production company, based in Santa Monica, California.
It is privately owned by Bruce Willis and Arnold Rifkin. When the company launched, the company signed a first look deal with Revolution Studios.

For the most part, the company has produced or co-produced projects that star Bruce Willis.

Films
 Hangman (2017)
 Sacrifice (2016)
 Dum Maaro Dum (2011)
 Deception (2008)
 Who's Your Caddy? (2007)
 Live Free or Die Hard (2007)
 Just My Luck (2006)
 16 Blocks (2006)
 Black Water Transit (2006)
 Scarlett (TV film) (2006)
 Serial (2006)
 Hostage (2005)
 The Whole Ten Yards (2004)
 The Law and Mr. Lee (TV film) (2003)
 Tears of the Sun (2003)
 True West (TV film) (2002)
 The Crocodile Hunter: Collision Course (2002)
 Hart's War (2002)
 Bandits (2001)

Television series
 Full Throttle Saloon (2009)
 Touching Evil (2004)
 Gary the Rat (2003)

References

Film production companies of the United States
Television production companies of the United States
Entertainment companies based in California
Companies based in Santa Monica, California
Entertainment companies established in 1999
Mass media companies established in 1999
1999 establishments in California
American film studios